This is a list of shogi software (engines and/or Graphical User Interfaces):

GUIs

 激指 (Gekisashi)
 将棋所 (Shogidokoro)
 ShogiGUI
 将棋ぶらうざＱ (Shogi Browser Q)
 XBoard

Engines

 AlphaZero
 Apery 
 Ukamuse (浮かむ瀬 – the 2016 release of Apery) 
 BlunderXX 
 Bonanza
 elmo 
 Gikou (技巧) 
 GNUShogi 
 GPS Shogi 
 Honey Waffle
 Laramie
 Lesserkai
 Lightning
 nozomi
 Ponanza
 Ponanza Quartet
 Qhapaq 
 aperypaq (Apery SDT5 with Qhapaq learning)
 eloqhappa (elmo WCSC27 with Qhapaq learning) 
 relmo (elmo WCSC27 + rezero8),
 rezero
 Silent Majority 
 Spear
 SSP
 Tanuki (ナイツ・オブ・タヌキ WCSC27, 平成将棋合戦ぽんぽこ SDT5) 
 TJshogi
 YaneuraOu (やねうら王) 
 Yomita (読み太)

See also 

 Computer shogi
 List of chess software
 List of shogi video games

References

External links 

 将棋フリーソフト · shogi engine rating site

Shogi
Software